The RWD 23 was a Polish low-wing trainer aircraft of 1938, constructed by the RWD team, that remained a prototype.

Development
The aircraft was designed in 1938 to fill the gap in the Polish trainer aircraft, by creating a light low-wing trainer. All trainers built in series in Poland to that point were high-wing monoplanes, for example the RWD-8 or the various biplanes. The main designer was Andrzej Anczutin  of the RWD bureau. Among the designers were also Bronisław Żurakowski and Tadeusz Chyliński. Chyliński designed the base mount for its engine. The plane was similar to de Havilland Moth Minor, but over 100 kg lighter. Low power output and simple wooden construction would make it cheap and economical in service, and therefore it might replace the RWD-8 in aeroclubs.

The first prototype (registration SP-BPO) was flown in late 1938 or early 1939 in Warsaw by E. Przysiecki. It underwent factory trials in June 1939, then it was given to tests to the Aviation Technical Institute. It was destroyed in the first days of World War II, in September 1939. The plane was found as successful, it could also perform basic aerobatics.

The second improved prototype was under construction when the war broke out, but it was not completed. The LOPP paramilitary organization ordered a series of 10 aircraft, that were not completed due to the war.

Description
Wooden construction low-wing cantilever monoplane, conventional in layout, with a fixed landing gear and open cockpits. Fuselage semi-monocoque, rectangular in cross-section, plywood-covered. Single-piece trapezoid wings with rounded tips, single-spar, plywood (front) and canvas covered, fitted with flaps. Conventional tail of a shape typical to RWD designs, like RWD 8, plywood (fins) and canvas (elevators and rudder) covered. Two open cockpits in tandem, with individual windshields and twin controls. Rear cockpit was raised a bit for a better view. Conventional fixed landing gear with a rear skid, main gear in aerodynamic covers.

 Walter Mikron II inline engine in front, with two-blade wooden propeller.  Cirrus Minor or 63 hp Avia 3 engines could also to be installed. Fuel tank 45 L in a fuselage, cruise fuel consumption 14 L/h.
(

Specifications (RWD 23 prototype)

See also

References

Andrzej Glass: "Polskie konstrukcje lotnicze 1893-1939" (Polish aviation constructions 1893-1939), WKiŁ, Warsaw 1977 , no ISBN

External links

Photos and drawings at Ugolok Neba

1930s Polish civil trainer aircraft
RWD-23
Low-wing aircraft
Single-engined tractor aircraft
Aircraft first flown in 1938